Lipno is a lake in the Tuchola Forest, in Gmina Dziemiany, Pomeranian Voivodeship of Northern Poland.

References

External links

Lakes of Pomeranian Voivodeship
Lakes of Poland